Chaetocnema hortensis is a species of flea beetle from Chrysomelidae family.

Description

Distribution
The species can be found in the Palearctic region, in eastern part of Amur region and Europe (Bavaria and the United Kingdom).

References

Alticini
Beetles described in 1880
Beetles of Europe